Lauren Conlin Adams (born August 7, 1982) is an American actress and improviser living in New York City.

Early life and education 
Adams was born in Washington, D.C. in 1982 and grew up in Potomac, Maryland. She graduated from Elon University in North Carolina with a BFA in 2004.

Career 
Adams has studied at the Upright Citizens Brigade since August 2007 under Bobby Moynihan, Lennon Parham, Zach Woods, Michael Delaney, Anthony King and Chris Gethard. At UCB, Lauren performed Oscarbait and was a member of former Maude Team Slow Burn and former Harold Teams Johnny Romance and Sherlock & Cookies. She still performs regularly as a member of the Upright Citizens Brigade Theatre.

In Netflix's series Unbreakable Kimmy Schmidt, Adams played Gretchen Chalker, a willing, overzealous member of the cult, who believed everything she was told and who failed to adapt to life outside of a cult. Adams also appeared in an episode of The Break with Michelle Wolf entitled “Bad Opinions,” in a skit about the New York Times op-ed section.

Filmography

Film

Television

References

External links
 

Living people
American actresses
1982 births
Elon University alumni
Actresses from Washington, D.C.
21st-century American actresses